Argyresthia thoracella is a moth of the  family Yponomeutidae. It is found in the United States including Oklahoma, Arizona, Nevada and eastern California.

The wingspan is about 9 mm. The forewings are silvery pearly white with light golden markings. The hindwings are whitish gray.

The larvae feed on juniper species.

References

Moths described in 1907
Argyresthia
Moths of North America